Dennis Hughes (9 April 1931 – October 1990) was an English footballer who played in the Football League for Stoke City.

Career
Hughes played amateur football with Fenton in Stoke-on-Trent and played a match for Stoke City during the 1950–51 season. He played at outside right against Huddersfield Town in a 1–0 defeat before returning to amateur football with Congleton Town.

Career statistics

References

English footballers
Stoke City F.C. players
English Football League players
1931 births
1990 deaths
Congleton Town F.C. players
Association football outside forwards